Río Turbio is a town in Santa Cruz Province, Argentina.

Río Turbio, Spanish for muddy river or cloudy river, may refer to:

 Turbio River (Copiapó),  a river in the Coquimbo Region, Chile
 Turbio River, known in Spanish as Río Turbio, a river in Argentina and Chile (Aysén Region)
 Turbio River (Venezuela), river in Venezuela
 Rio Turbio Airport, an airport near 28 de Noviembre town, in Santa Cruz Province, Argentina
 Rio turbio (film), a 1952 Argentinian film